Bowmanston is a populated place in the parish of Saint John, Barbados.
It is the home of the Bowmanston water pumping station.

See also
 List of cities, towns and villages in Barbados

References

Saint John, Barbados
Populated places in Barbados